UAAP Season 65 is the 2002–2003 season of the University Athletic Association of the Philippines, which was hosted by National University. The season opened on July 13, 2002.

Broadcast by ABS-CBN Sports aired on Studio 23 for the third consecutive year. The theme music of the UAAP was "Energy III" composed by Craig Palmer recorded in the late 1980s at Network Music Ensemble.

Basketball

Men's tournament

Elimination round

Bracket

Overall championship race

Juniors' division

Seniors' division

List of Most Valuable Players

Seniors' division

Juniors' division
 
 
 
 
 
 
 
 
 

Reference:

See also
NCAA Season 78

External links
UBelt.com - UAAP Season 65 - Final Overall Championship Tally
UST Emerge Overall UAAP Champions

References

 
2002 in Philippine sport
65